Ratta Kadim  is a village in Kapurthala district of Punjab State, India. The village is administrated by a Sarpanch, who is an elected representative.

Demography 
According to the report published by Census India in 2011, Ratta Kadim has 29 houses with the total population of 204 persons of which 98 are male and 106 females. Literacy rate of Ratta Kadim is 82.16%, higher than the state average of 75.84%.  The population of children in the age group 0–6 years is 19 which is 9.31% of the total population. Child sex ratio is approximately 1082, higher than the state average of 846.

Population data

References

External links
  Villages in Kapurthala
 Kapurthala Villages List

Villages in Kapurthala district